The women's 800 metres event  at the 1974 European Athletics Indoor Championships was held on 9 and 10 March in Gothenburg.

Medalists

Results

Heats
Held on 9 March.First 3 from each heat (Q) qualified directly for the final.

Final
Held on 10 March.

References

800 metres at the European Athletics Indoor Championships
800